André Ferreira da Silva (born April 9, 1980) is a Brazilian football player. He currently plays as defensive midfielder.

He formerly played for Ankaragücü in the Süper Lig and Japanese side Montedio Yamagata.

References

1980 births
Living people
MKE Ankaragücü footballers
Associação Atlética Ponte Preta players
União Agrícola Barbarense Futebol Clube players
Esporte Clube Vitória players
Sociedade Esportiva do Gama players
Montedio Yamagata players
América Futebol Clube (RN) players
Brazilian footballers
Brazilian expatriate footballers
Brazilian expatriate sportspeople in Turkey
Expatriate footballers in Turkey
Süper Lig players
Expatriate footballers in Japan
J1 League players
Association football midfielders